The Finnish Ayrshire is a Finnish breed of dairy cattle. It derives from Scottish Ayrshire stock imported to Finland between about 1847 and 1923. It is the most numerous dairy breed of the country, constituting approximately 61% of the dairy herd.

History 

A breed society, the Afvelsföreningen för Ayrshire-boskap i Finland, was formed in 1901; a herd-book was started in the same year.

In the 1960s and 1970s Finnish Ayrshire semen was used to improve the dairy capabilities of the Ayrshire in the United Kingdom.

Its conservation status was given as "not at risk" by the FAO in 2007 and by DAD-IS in 2021.

Characteristics 

The cattle are multi-coloured red and white.

Use 

The cattle are reared for their milk.

References

External links
FABA
N-EURO-CAD
NordGen (Arctic Ark) in Finnish, in English
Geno

Cattle breeds
Cattle breeds originating in Finland